A pukara (Aymara and Quechua for "fortress", hispanicized spellings pucara, pucará, also pukará) is a pre-Hispanic central Andean fortress.

Pukara  may also refer to:

Fortresses 
 Pukara, Coporaque, an archaeological site in the Coporaque District, Caylloma Province, Arequipa Region, Peru
 Pukara, Puno, an archaeological site in the Puno Region, Peru, and focus of the Pukara culture of the first centuries AD
 Pukara, Víctor Fajardo, an archaeological site in the Víctor Fajardo Province, Ayacucho Region, Peru
 Pukara, Vilcas Huamán, an archaeological site on top of the mountain Pukara in the Vilcas Huamán Province, Ayacucho Region, Peru
 Chena Pukara in Chile
 Puka Pukara just outside the city of Cusco, Peru
 Waqra Pukara in the Upper Apurímac  canyon, Cusco Region, Peru
 Pukará de Quitor, near San Pedro de Atacama, northern Chile
 Pukará de Lasana in Chile
 Pucara del Cerro La Muralla in Chile
 Pukara de La Compañia in Chile
 Pucará de Tilcara in Argentina

Places 
 Pucará Canton in Ecuador and its capital
 Pucará District, Huancayo, a district in the Junín Region, Peru and its capital
 Pucará District, Jaén, a district in the Cajamarca Region, Peru and its capital
 Pucará District, Lampa, a district in the Puno Region, Peru and its capital
 Pucará (Vallegrande), a town in the Santa Cruz Department, Bolivia

Mountains 
 Pukara (Antiti), a mountain near Antiti in the San Pedro de Totora Province, Oruro Department, Bolivia
 Pukara (Cochabamba), a mountain in the Cochabamba Department, Bolivia
 Pukara (Condesuyos), a mountain in the Condesuyos Province, Arequipa Region, Peru
 Pukara (Cusco), in the Cusco Region, Peru
 Pukara (Guaqui), in the Guaqui Municipality, Ingavi Province, La Paz Department, Bolivia
 Pukara (Huacanapi), a mountain near Huacanapi in the San Pedro de Totora Province, Oruro Department, Bolivia
 Pukara (Jesús de Machaca), in the Jesús de Machaca Municipality, Ingavi Province, La Paz Department, Bolivia
 Pukara (Lari), in the Lari District, Caylloma Province, Arequipa Region, Peru
 Pukara (Loayza), in the Loayza Province, La Paz Department, Bolivia
 Pukara (Marquirivi), a mountain near Marquirivi in the San Pedro de Totora Province, Oruro Department, Bolivia
 Pukara (Mejillones), in the Carangas Municipality, Mejillones Province, Oruro Department, Bolivia
 Pukara (Moquegua), in the Moquegua Region, Peru
 Pukara (Murillo), in the Murillo Province, La Paz Department, Bolivia
 Pukara (Pacajes), in the Pacajes Province, La Paz Department, Bolivia
 Pukara (Poopó), in the Poopó Province, Oruro Department, Bolivia
 Pukara (Potosí), a mountain in the Potosí Department, Bolivia
 Pukara (Sandia), a mountain in the Sandia Province, Puno Region, Peru, with an archaeological site on top
 Pukara (Tarucani), in the Tarucani District, Arequipa Province, Arequipa Region, Peru
 Pukara (Yapu Qullu), near Yapu Qullu in the Carangas Municipality, Mejillones Province, Oruro Department, Bolivia

River 
 Pukara Mayu, a river in Bolivia

Others 
 Club Pucará, and Argentine sports club
 FMA IA 58 Pucará, an Argentine counter-insurgency / attack aircraft
 Pucará, a culture of the Andean formative period

See also 
 Pucarani, a town in the La Paz Department, Bolivia
 Pukarani (Peru), a mountain in the Puno Region, Peru
 Anti Pukara, a mountain in the Cusco Region, Peru
 Inka Pukara (disambiguation), several mountains
 Jach'a Pukara, a mountain in the Larecaja Province, La Paz Department, Bolivia
 Jach'a Pukara (Inquisivi), a mountain in the Inquisivi Province, La Paz Department, Bolivia
 Wila Pukara, a mountain in the La Paz Department, Bolivia
 Wila Pukarani, a mountain in the Oruro Department, Bolivia